Greg Burel (born William Gregory Burel) is the former director (2010-2020) of the United States Strategic National Stockpile, which proved to be a critical component of the U.S. federal response to the 2019-2020 coronavirus pandemic.

His long-planned retirement in January 2020 came after 38 years in government service. Although Burel retired about a month before the major U.S. outbreak of the coronavirus, he said if he had any indication it would have happened, he would have stayed in the job.

Education 
Greg Burel attended Georgia State University in Atlanta, where he received a Bachelor of Business Administration. He finished the strategic leadership course at US Office of Personnel Management’s Federal Executive Institute’s “Leadership for a Democratic Society” Program, studying with other senior (GS-15 and above) public service executives. He has completed intensive studies in finance, incident command and process improvement as well as participating in Harvard University’s Kennedy School of Government National Preparedness Leadership Initiative.

Government service 
Burel’s government employment commenced in 1982 when he began working in the US Internal Revenue Service. He moved on to positions with increasing responsibility in the General Services Administration, and the Federal Emergency Management Agency, where he was director of the Administration and Resource Planning division. He served FEMA through many disasters and emergencies as Logistics Chief and Regional Operations Center Director with responsibility for emergency logistics and planning throughout the southeastern United States. Additionally, he served as a member of the FEMA Logistics Advisory Group where he and his colleagues evaluated emergencies and disasters.

In 2005, he was chosen as part of the Senior Executive Service and began working with the Centers for Disease Control (CDC), beginning with the National Center for Health Informatics. In 2007 he became director of the Division of the Strategic National Stockpile.

SNS director 
Greg Burel served as the director of the SNS for 12 years before his retirement in January 2020. While director, he was the agency leader for over 200 personnel overseeing an annual appropriated budget of over $500 million.

Edward Gabriel, the Department of Health and Human Services principal deputy assistant secretary for preparedness and response, credited Burel with making the SNS “as relevant as it currently is” saying that Burel’s “unique ability to work with the private sector has made him one of the best in the medical supply chain business.”  In 2016, an HHS deputy assistant secretary said that Burel “has done a stellar job for nearly 10 years.”

A senior official at the federal Substance Abuse and Mental Health Services Administration credited Burel with making distribution of supplies from the SNS “more rapid than ever before.” 

To improve the nation’s supplies of medicines and other vital items for a biological event, he recommended that drug manufacturers hold more materials within their U.S.-based facilities, rather than having materials being held at offshore plants in other countries.

The Strategic National Stockpile is meant for “a very bad day that we hope never happens,” Burel said in a 2020 podcast interview. According to NBC News, “The Strategic National Stockpile, or SNS, is meant to be used for brief periods until the supply chain resumes normally, other supplies are manufactured or the president invokes the Defense Production Act.”  During emergencies, SNS officials work with both public (government) and private companies to “find and close gaps” in materials, supplies, and other items necessary for the emergency; then, the SNS goes and procures those items that it needs. The intention behind the SNS is not to be the solution to a public health crisis. Rather, it is to be used as a temporary stopgap during an emergency while the longer-term solutions get developed.

Supplies in the Strategic National Stockpile include antibiotics, antidotes, antitoxins, life-support medications, airway maintenance supplies and medical and surgical items. The number of SNS warehouses, as well as their locations, are national security secrets. The general estimate is that the stockpile holds $8 billion worth of items. These items range from vaccines, antibiotics, medical equipment and protective supplies. Burel said, when asked how much warehouse space the SNS takes up, that it is approximately the square footage of 12 Super Walmarts – or possibly even more.

According to Burel, some drugs needed in a biological event such as a pandemic are available only through the SNS.

SNS history 
Since its creation, the SNS has responded to over 60 public health emergencies. These emergencies have included both natural disasters (Hurricane Katrina, for example) and disease outbreaks.

In 1999, Congress created the Strategic National Stockpile. It was originally named the National Pharmaceutical Stockpile. The stockpile’s first budget was a $51 million appropriation and it had only a “handful of staff,” according to Burel in a 2019 article he co-authored on the Department of Health and Human Services website. Today, the stockpile operates under the U.S. Department of Health and Human Services Assistant Secretary for Preparedness and Response. It holds a $7 billion inventory.

On the morning of the 9/11 attacks, the government called for stockpile supplies that day as a part of the immediate response. The attacks had come just one month after the stockpile, FAA, and New York emergency departments staged “their first full-scale exercise.”

Emergency response professionals, from scientists to doctors, became very aware of the real dangers of bioterrorism after the 2001 anthrax attacks.

The SNS response to the 2009 H1N1 influenza event marked the largest deployment in history of any nation’s stockpile. In that event, the SNS was able to deliver quality, necessary materials to the states during the early stages of the event. It showed that all the prior preparation had paid off. After the H1N1 event, SNS officials studied their own response and learned how to improve their own capabilities in the future.

Funding and preparedness 
The SNS is designed so that its inventory can be deployed quickly to anywhere in the United States in under 12 hours. One of the key issues around preparedness is that each year the leadership of the stockpile had to choose how to spend its annual budget—on which threats to prepare for, and in what proportion. The leaders could never have prepared for the kind of mass event that unfolded with the coronavirus pandemic.

In the coronavirus pandemic supplemental appropriations bill passed by Congress and signed by President Trump, more money was allocated to the Strategic National Stockpile. Additionally, the SNS recently issued a request for proposal (RFP) to buy 500 million masks over the next year. The RFP asks that entities with masks willing sell them send over a proposal to see if the two can come to a sales agreement.

In his role as the director, Burel noted that while the SNS is designed to help during large events like a terrorist attack or pandemic, it also helps in smaller, more containable emergencies. In April 2015, he got a call around 2 p.m. from an Ohio doctor describing a possible “life-threatening botulism outbreak that posed a risk to as many as 50 people.” Burel issued an approval for medication from the stockpile that ended up getting to the victims shortly after midnight and help saved the lives of 18 people who had become seriously sick.

In 2009, the stockpile gave out critical supplies in the H1N1 pandemic and did not fully replenish those supplies. Thus, the stockpile was not at its fullest capacity before the coronavirus pandemic hit. During the response to H1N1, the SNS provided 20 million pieces of PPE and 85 million N95 masks.

In the response to Ebola in 2014, the CDC ordered $2.7 million in PPE for the stockpile.

Burel response to COVID-19 pandemic 
In 2016, NPR wrote, “Thousands of lives might someday depend on this stockpile . . .”

In his 38 year career as an emergency management professional, Burel said that although he had hoped the response to this pandemic could have been stronger, it is difficult to point to a response to any historic event where the response would have been considered “great out of the box.”  He defended the SNS, stating that the shortages of personal protective equipment across the U.S. in the midst of the coronavirus pandemic is a function of a systemwide failure in the nation’s health care delivery system.  He said that although the stockpile has over $8 bullion in material, he still considers it underfunded.

When asked why he considers funding less than adequate, Burel explained, “In any preparedness role, the further away from an event you move, the lower the likelihood that you will get funding for it. That goes the same for public engagement, too.”

When asked which issues he thought most important, in the midst of the coronavirus pandemic, Burel mentioned three specific items: masks, antibiotics, and ventilators. The stockpile for masks will never be the final answer; rather, it can act as a bridge between the private sector health system and the market. On ventilators, Burel showed concern, saying that the community mitigation measures recommended by the CDC and Dr. Anthony Fauci, should be followed in order to flatten the disease curve, because if the curve is not checked, the US hospital system will be overwhelmed. Ventilators, are expensive, and require more care and maintenance management than other items in the stockpile.

Burel said antibiotics are extremely important for secondary infections that could develop as a result of contracting COVID-19.

Burel acknowledges that the public’s perception of the government’s response to the coronavirus pandemic is mostly a function of their political leanings. People who support President Trump typically will say that the response has been adequate, while people who oppose President Trump say the response is not.

The key reasons behind the supply issues from the SNS during the coronavirus pandemic, according to Burel, are two-fold. First, the stockpile had limited funds. Second, it had to use those funds to buy expensive equipment and treatments that are not manufactured in big numbers (because they are for such rare events).

“We have found ourselves in a perfect storm today in that we saw an immediate cut-off of product that was coming from outside the United States,” Burel said, referring to the critically needed personal protective equipment, including N95 masks. “Secondly, the next thing that happened is, there were immediate surge requirements where people tried to stock up on this product as we started to hear about coronavirus and cases started to appear in advance. So that was putting additional pressure on the limited supply that is being made in the United States.”

In a March 30, 2020 interview with CBS News, Burel said that the stockpile system is very stressed. The U.S. began tapping the SNS for supplies to respond to the coronavirus pandemic in early March 2020.  He stated that even if the stockpile had unlimited funds, not everything that everyone needed would have been available.

Post government 
In February 2020, Burel joined the private sector when he became President and Principal Consultant at Hamilton Grace, a Washington DC government relations agency.

Recognition and awards 
Burel was among the winners of the 2015 Daniel H. Wagner Prize for Excellence in Operations Research Practice for his paper, Machine Learning for Predicting Vaccine Immunogenicity.

In 2016, Burel was the winner of the Partnership for Public Service’s “Management Excellence” award during his role as director of the Division of Strategic National Stockpile at the CDC.

He received the Samuel J. Hayman Service to America Medal, the “Sammie,” in the management excellence category, specifically for his managing ten responses to major hurricanes, floods and influenza pandemics as well as 30 incidents treating people with infection diseases including botulism and Ebola. He was also cited for his work during the Zika virus epidemic where he coordinated the SNS’s efforts with the CDC Foundation and private industry.

The award, known as the “Oscar” of government service, is “…awarded to a handful of federal employees each year for outstanding service to their country and humanity.”

See also 

 Strategic National Stockpile

References

External links
 “Former head of Strategic National Stockpile on coronavirus shortages: Many links in supply chain were not prepared” (Fox News)
 

Georgia State University alumni
Trump administration personnel
Obama administration personnel
Living people
Year of birth missing (living people)